George Yaraq (born 1958) is a Lebanese journalist and novelist.

His first novel Night was published in 2013. His second novel Guard of the Dead was shortlisted for the 2016 Arabic Booker Prize.

References

Living people
Lebanese novelists
1958 births
Date of birth missing (living people)